Barakat is an Arabic word meaning blessings. It may refer to:

Persons
 Barakat (surname)
 Barkatullah (disambiguation), a male given name

Others
 Barakat syndrome, also known as HDR syndrome
 Barakat!, 2006 French-Algerian film, directed by Djamila Sahraoui
 Barakat (2020 film), a South African drama film
 al-Barakat, Somali consortium
 Barakat, Inc., an American NGO working in India, Pakistan, and Afghanistan

See also 
 Berakhah (Birkath-)
 Bereket (disambiguation)
 Bereket (name)
 Barack Obama
 COVIran Barekat